Miriaél Géanne Taylor (born 2 February 2000) is an English footballer who plays as a midfielder in the Women's Super League (WSL) for Liverpool.

Early life
Taylor was born in Gillingham, Kent. An only child, she began playing football with a local boys' club. She started with Chelsea's youth team at age 12, moving up to the reserves and eventually the first team.

College career
Taylor attended Hofstra University, earning a degree in rhetoric and public advocacy. In her sophomore year, in 2019, she started all 22 matches and scored nine goals, of which five were game winners. Taylor also started every game in the 2020 season, but the COVID-19 pandemic meant the team played only nine, in the spring of 2021. Her senior year, she started 21 matches, recording 17 goals, tied for second-most in program history, and 11 assists. Her 31 career assists were a program record. In 2021, she was a United Soccer Coaches first-team All American and a MAC Hermann semi-finalist.

Club career

Chelsea, 2012–2017
After having played with the club's youth and reserves sides, Taylor moved up to the first team at age 16. She made her first appearance against Doncaster Rovers Belles, coming on for Karen Carney in the 82nd minute.

Arsenal, 2017–2018
Taylor moved to Arsenal for one season before attending college in the United States.

Angel City, 2022–2023
Angel City selected Taylor in the fourth round of the 2022 NWSL Draft, 39th overall. She made her first appearance on 15 May 2022, against the Washington Spirit. She got her first start on 11 June 2022, against Racing Louisville FC. Taylor played a total of 342 minutes in 11 matches in her first season. She played at right wing, center forward, and central midfielder at different times over the course of the season.

Liverpool, 2023–
In January 2023, Taylor returned to England, signing with Women's Super League club Liverpool.

Honors

College 
MAC Hermann semi-finalist: 2021
United Soccer Coaches All-America First Team: 2021
CAA Attacking Player of the Year: 2021

References

External links
 
 

2000 births
Living people
English women's footballers
Footballers from Kent
People from Kent
People from Gillingham, Kent
English footballers
Arsenal W.F.C. players
Chelsea F.C. Women players
Women's association football midfielders
Hofstra Pride women's soccer players
Angel City FC players
Liverpool F.C. Women players
National Women's Soccer League players
England women's youth international footballers
Angel City FC draft picks